David Tlale (29 January 1975) is a South African fashion designer. He was born in a township called Vosloorus in South Africa. David Tlale was raised by a single parent the late Joyce Tlale. David is known by his craft that advocates on its own his work has been showcased at the Cape Town Fashion Week, New York Fashion Week, and Paris Fashion Week and who has also designed collections for major retailers like Edgars. Tlale was a semi finalist at the South African Fashion Week Elle New Talent Show Competition in 2002. In May 2003, Tlale started design studios in Cape Town and Johannesburg.

Awards and nominations

References

South African fashion designers
Living people
1975 births